The 1969 U.S. Women's Open was the 24th U.S. Women's Open, held June 26–29 at Scenic Hills Country Club in Pensacola, Florida.

Donna Caponi, age 24, won the first of her two consecutive U.S. Women's Opens, one stroke ahead of runner-up Peggy Wilson. It was the first of four major titles for Caponi and the first of 24 victories on the LPGA Tour.

Caponi was five strokes behind Ruth Jessen at the start of the final round, played in oppressive  heat and humidity. After hitting her tee shot on the 72nd hole, there was a brief weather delay due to a thunderstorm and she returned with a birdie for a final round 69 (−4).

Past champions in the field

Source:

Final leaderboard
Sunday, June 29, 1969

Source:

References

External links
Golf Observer final leaderboard
U.S. Women's Open Golf Championship
U.S. Women's Open – past champions – 1969
Scenic Hills Country Club

U.S. Women's Open
Golf in Florida
Sports competitions in Florida
History of Pensacola, Florida
Women's sports in Florida
U.S. Women's Open
U.S. Women's Open
U.S. Women's Open
U.S. Women's Open